Hossein Mehraban is an Iranian football forward who currently plays for Iranian football club Shahr Khodro F.C. in the Persian Gulf Pro League.

Club career

Padideh
He joined Padideh in November 2014 with three-years contract. He made his debut for Padideh in 2014–15 Iran Pro League against Esteghlal Khuzestan as substitute for Bahodir Nasimov.

International career

Under–17
Mehraban participated with the Iran national under-17 football team in the 2013 FIFA U-17 World Cup.

Under–20
He was invited to the Iran national under-20 football team by Ali Doustimehr to participating in the 2014 AFC U-19 Championship.

Club career statistics

References

External links
 Hossein Mehraban at IranLeague.ir

1996 births
Living people
Iranian footballers
Shahr Khodro F.C. players
Iran under-20 international footballers
Association football forwards